Kosarikha is a rural locality (a village) in Kharovskoye Rural Settlement, Kharovsky District, Vologda Oblast, Russia. The population was 7 as of 2002.

Geography 
Kosarikha is located km northeast of Kharovsk (the district's administrative centre) by road. Yesyunikha is the nearest rural locality.

References 

Rural localities in Kharovsky District